Graciana del Castillo (Uruguay - New York City, March 22, 2019) was a Uruguayan economist, professor, writer, businesswoman, and international strategist. At the age of nineteen, she settled in New York City, United States. She studied economics, and received her master's and doctorate degrees at Columbia University, where she was also a professor. She worked at the United Nations International Monetary Fund, specializing in designing economic policies for El Salvador, Kosovo and Afghanistan. She co-founded the consulting firm Macroeconomics Advisory Group (MAG) with Mario Blejer.

Selected works
She was the author of the books:

 2008, Rebuilding War Torn States
 2011, Redrawing the Lines
 2013, Guilty Part. The International Community in Afghanistan

References

2019 deaths
Uruguayan essayists
Uruguayan economists
Columbia University alumni
Columbia University faculty
20th-century women
21st-century women
Year of birth missing
People from New York City